Opera is a comune (municipality) in the Metropolitan City of Milan in the Italian region Lombardy, located about  southeast of Milan.

Opera borders the following municipalities: Locate di Triulzi, Milan, Pieve Emanuele, Rozzano, San Donato Milanese. It is home to the early 13th century Abbey of Mirasole.

References

External links
 Official website

Cities and towns in Lombardy